Bay Islet or See Chau is an uninhabited island in Sai Kung District, Hong Kong.

Geography
Bay Islet is located in Rocky Harbour, also known as Leung Shuen Wan Hoi, and is separated from Jin Island by the See Chau Mun channel. The island has a maximum elevation of 44.8 m and an area of 8 hectares.

References

Uninhabited islands of Hong Kong
Sai Kung District
Islands of Hong Kong